Nikola Gjorgiev (born 23 July 1988) is a Macedonian volleyball player, a member of North Macedonia men's national volleyball team and Japanese club Osaka Blazers Sakai, 2009 Serbian Champion, 2017 Japanese Champion.

Career

National team
In 2015 Macedonian national team, including Gjorgiev, met with Slovenia in the finale of 2015 European League and achieved silver medal. Gjorgiev was chosen the Best Outside Spiker of the tournament. One year later, his national team also went to the finale, but was beaten by Estonia. He received an individual award for the Best Opposite Spiker.

Sporting achievements

Clubs

National championships
 2007/2008  Serbian Cup, with OK Radnički Kragujevac
 2007/2008  Serbian Championship, with OK Radnički Kragujevac
 2008/2009  Serbian Championship, with OK Radnički Kragujevac
 2014/2015  French Championship, with Paris Volley
 2015/2016  Japanese Championship, with Toray Arrows
 2016/2017  Japanese Championship, with Toray Arrows

National team
 2015  European League
 2016  European League

Individually
 2015 European League - Best Outside Spiker
 2016 European League - Best Opposite Spiker
 2017 European league - Best Opposite Spiker

References

External links
 LegaVolley profile

1988 births
Living people
Sportspeople from Strumica
Macedonian men's volleyball players
Expatriate volleyball players in Poland
Expatriate volleyball players in France
Paris Volley players
Projekt Warsaw players
Osaka Blazers Sakai players
Expatriate volleyball players in Japan